Warp Brothers is the electronic dance music group started by German DJs Oliver Goedicke and Jürgen Dohr in 1999. Their style includes house, trance, breakbeat and electro in early days, lately hard dance, trance and psytrance.

At the beginning of their career their most successful hits were "Phatt Bass", "We Will Survive" and "Blast the Speakers", which charted in several countries.

The original version of "Phatt Bass" was by Warp Brothers vs. Aquagen, based on New Order's "Confusion" (Pump Panel Reconstruction Mix), and should not be confused with Public Domain's "Operation Blade", which was based on the same song. "Blast the Speakers" was featured on the 2005 techno album Radikal Techno 6.

In 2010 Jürgen Dohr left the group. In 2015 Peter Sildegren is joining Oliver Goedicke and making come back for Warp Brothers.

The success of “Phatt Bass 2016” vs. Wolfpack (#1 at Beatport and amongst the three most played club and festival tunes of the year) gave them support from Armin Van Buuren, Tiesto, Afrojack, David Guetta, Hardwell, W&W, and Dash Berlin.

Singles
2000: "Phatt Bass" (vs. Aquagen)
2001: "We Will Survive"
2002: "Blast the Speakers"
2002: "The Power"
2002: "Cokane"
2003: "Going Insane" (feat. Red Monkey)
2005: "Phatt Bass"
2006: "Push Up"
2007: "Dominator"
2008: "Phatt Bass" (vs. Ali Payami)
2016: "Phatt Bass" (vs. Wolfpack)
2017: "Cokane"
2018: "Husten" (vs. Dj Bonebreaker)
2018: "Time & Space"
2019: "Warped Jump"
2019: "Ska Train" (vs. Dj Quicksilver feat. The Beatmasters)
2020: "Dreamworld" (vs. Pablo Quinones)
2021: "Trippin In Goa"
2021: "Kanlaon" (with Maharlika Muiska)

Selected discography
Warp 10 (2002)
Warp Factor (2003)
TranzWorld, Vol. 6.0 (2003)
TranzWorld, Vol. 7 (2004)
TranzWorld, Vol. 8 (2004)
TranzWorld, Vol. 9 (2005)
Live in Sydney (2005)
Big in Japan (2006)

Remixes

References

External links
Official Facebook page
Official Web
Official YouTube Channel

Club DJs
German musical duos
German house music groups
German trance music groups
Musical groups established in 1999
1999 establishments in Germany